Szalejów Dolny  is a village in the administrative district of Gmina Kłodzko, within Kłodzko County, Lower Silesian Voivodeship, in south-western Poland. It is located in Kłodzko Land.

References

Villages in Kłodzko County